The 1977–78 Western Kentucky Hilltoppers men's basketball team represented Western Kentucky University during the 1977–78 NCAA Division I men's basketball season. The Hilltoppers were members of the Ohio Valley Conference and led by coach Jim Richards, in his final year at the helm.  WKU finished third in the OVC regular season, but won the tournament championship and the conference's automatic bid to the 1978 NCAA Division I Basketball Tournament, where they advanced to the sweet sixteen.  James Johnson and Darryl Turner made the All-OVC Team and Aaron Bryant was selected to the OVC Tournament Team.

Schedule

|-
!colspan=6| Regular season

|-

 

|-
!colspan=6| 1978 Ohio Valley Conference Men's Basketball Tournament

|-
!colspan=6| 1978 NCAA Division I Basketball Tournament

References

Western Kentucky Hilltoppers basketball seasons
Western Kentucky
Western Kentucky
Western Kentucky Basketball, Men's
Western Kentucky Basketball, Men's